Beth Israel Congregation (or Beth Israel Synagogue) is a historic Conservative synagogue located at 401 Scott Street in Beaufort, South Carolina. Built in 1908, it is one of the few wooden synagogues in continued usage in the southeastern United States.

History
Though the number of Jews remained sporadic and sparse until the 1880s, Jews always fared well in the small coastal town of Beaufort, South Carolina. With the mass immigration of Yiddish-speaking Eastern European Jews to Beaufort beginning in the 1880s, the Jewish population of the town grew to well over 30 families and soon prompted the need for a formal congregation. Countries of origin included Russia, Latvia, and Lithuania. While the Jewish community in Beaufort predates the American Revolutionary War, its residents prayed informally in a number of locations before obtaining space in the town's Masonic Hall and in the Beaufort Arsenal. Granted a state charter in 1905, the congregation was formed to purchase the land near the arsenal that became the site for their synagogue on Scott Street. A number of members participated in the construction of the building, which was dedicated in ceremonies held on June 14, 1908, which were led by Rabbi George Solomon of Savannah, Georgia. Initially an Orthodox congregation, Beth Israel became a Conservative congregation in 1949.

The congregation celebrated its 100th anniversary in 2005. Cantor Sheldon Feinberg noted that "to keep any entity for this length of time, particularly a house of worship, demands a great deal of dedication on the part of the members." President Joann Schor stated that beyond celebrating the synagogue's centennial, their task was "figuring out how to keep going for another 100 years."

Current status
Beth Israel is still an active Conservative congregation today with approximately 85 member families at its original building. A historical marker honoring the synagogue was unveiled on January 12, 2014.

References

External links
 Beth Israel Website
 Institute of Southern Jewish Life History of Beaufort Jews

1905 establishments in South Carolina
Ashkenazi Jewish culture in South Carolina
Buildings and structures in Beaufort, South Carolina
Conservative synagogues in the United States
Jewish organizations established in 1905
Latvian-Jewish culture in the United States
Lithuanian-Jewish culture in the United States
Russian-Jewish culture in the United States
Synagogues completed in 1908
Synagogues in South Carolina